Kasımlı is a village in the Baykan District of Siirt Province in Turkey. The village had a population of 343 in 2021.

The hamlets of Bölücek and Yuvacık are attached to the village.

Notable people 

 Şeyh Fethullah Verkanisi

References 

Kurdish settlements in Siirt Province
Villages in Baykan District